Bitton is a surname.

Bitton (spelled ביטון in Hebrew) is common among North African Sephardim. It comes from 'vita', life.

Notable people with this name include:

 Nir Bitton
 Ben Bitton
 Amit Bitton
 Naor Bitton
 Davis Bitton
 Yifat Bitton
 Yosef Bittón
 Isaac Bitton
 Thomas Bitton
 Raquel Bitton
 Simone Bitton
 Shimon Bitton
 Jean-Luc Bitton
 Thomas of Bitton
 Livia Bitton-Jackson
 Isaac Bitton (boxer)
 William of Bitton
 William of Bitton (nephew)

See also 
 Biton
 Byton

References